Magdalena Maleeva and Rennae Stubbs were the defending champions but were eliminated in the round robin.

Martina Navratilova and Selima Sfar defeated Lindsay Davenport and Mary Joe Fernandez in the final, 7–6(7–5), ret. to win the ladies' invitation doubles tennis title at the 2016 Wimbledon Championships.

Draw

Final

Group A
Standings are determined by: 1. number of wins; 2. number of matches; 3. in two-players-ties, head-to-head records; 4. in three-players-ties, percentage of sets won, or of games won; 5. steering-committee decision.

Group B
Standings are determined by: 1. number of wins; 2. number of matches; 3. in two-players-ties, head-to-head records; 4. in three-players-ties, percentage of sets won, or of games won; 5. steering-committee decision.

References
Ladies' Invitation Doubles

Women's Invitation Doubles
Wimbledon